The Route d'Occitanie is a road bicycle race with 4 stages held annually in Southern France. It was first held in 1977 and since 2005 it has been organised as a 2.1 event on the UCI Europe Tour. It is usually held a week before the Tour de France.

Name of the race
 1977 – 1981 : Tour du Tarn
 1982 – 1987 : Tour Midi-Pyrénées
 1988 – 2017 : La Route du Sud
 2018 – : Route d'Occitanie

Winners 

{{Cycling past winner rider|year=2002|name=<s>|nat=USA|team=}}

Multiple winners

Wins per country

External links
 

UCI Europe Tour races
Recurring sporting events established in 1977
1977 establishments in France
Cycle races in France